The Gross Aubrig (1,695 m or 5561 ft ) is a mountain of the Schwyzer Alps, overlooking the lake of Wägital in the canton of Schwyz. It lies north of the Fluebrig, on the range between the valley of the Sihl and the Wägital. Its child peak Chli Aubrig lies to the west.

References

External links
Gross Aubrig on Hikr

Mountains of the Alps
Mountains of Switzerland
Mountains of the canton of Schwyz
One-thousanders of Switzerland